The International Cricket Council (ICC) Women's Cricketer of the Year (known as the Rachael Heyhoe Flint Award since 2017 in memory of pioneering women's cricket player and administrator Rachael Heyhoe Flint) is an award given annually as part of the ICC Awards ceremony.

Introduced in 2006, the award adjudges the best-performed female international cricketer across an approximate twelve-month voting period. Prior to 2009, each of the top ten women's national teams nominated two players and the final selection was made by a 16-person panel. Since 2009, a long list has been chosen by the ICC Awards voting panel, consisting of cricket administrators, journalists and former players. A subsequent short list is then created by a different, 25-person, board.

Between 2006 and 2011, the award ran as a single category, known as the Women's Player of the Year. From 2012 to 2016, it was separated into two format-specific categories: the Women's ODI Player of the Year and Women's T20I Player of the Year awards. In 2017, an overall Women's Cricketer of the Year category was reintroduced, though the separate awards for One Day and Twenty20 cricket would continue to be presented.

In December 2020, after a reduced amount of international cricket had been played throughout the previous twelve months due to the COVID-19 pandemic, the ICC staged a special edition of its annual awards ceremony to recognise the best players of the past ten years. Australian all-rounder Ellyse Perry swept all three major female categories to be named the Women's ODI Player of the Decade, Women's T20I Player of the Decade and overall Women's Cricketer of the Decade.

To date, Perry has received the most awards across all three categories with a total of six wins. New Zealand batter Suzie Bates, England wicket-keeper Sarah Taylor and West Indies all-rounder Stafanie Taylor are the next-most-decorated players across all categories, having won a total of three awards each.

Winners

ICC Women's Cricketer of the Year

ICC Women's ODI Cricketer of the Year

ICC Women's T20I Cricketer of the Year

ICC Women's Emerging Cricketer of the Year

ICC Women's Associate Player of the Year

ICC Women's Cricketer of the Decade

See also

 Wisden Leading Woman Cricketer in the World
 Sir Garfield Sobers Trophy
 ICC Test Player of the Year
 ICC ODI Player of the Year

References

 
International Cricket Council awards and rankings
Women's cricket-related lists